Stigmochelys is a genus of tortoise endemic to Africa. Stigmochelys pardalis, the leopard tortoise, is the only extant species. A fossil species, Stigmochelys brachygularis is known from the Pliocene of Tanzania. Leopard tortoises were once placed in the genus Geochelone along with many other large tortoises.

References

Testudinidae
Turtle genera
Reptile genera with one living species
Taxa named by John Edward Gray